The 2021–22 Wake Forest Demon Deacons men's basketball team represented Wake Forest University during the 2021–22 NCAA Division I men's basketball season. The Demon Deacons were led by second-year head coach Steve Forbes and played their home games at the Lawrence Joel Veterans Memorial Coliseum in Winston-Salem, North Carolina as members of the Atlantic Coast Conference.

The Demon Deacons finished the season 25–10 overall and 13–7 in ACC play, to finish in fifth place.  They lost to Boston College in the Second Round of the ACC tournament.  They received an at-large bid to the NIT, where they defeated Towson and VCU in the first two rounds. Their season then ended in a quarterfinal loss to Texas A&M.

Previous season
The Demon Deacons finished 2020–21 season 6–16, 3–15 in ACC play, to finish in fourteenth place.  They lost to Notre Dame in the First Round of the ACC tournament.  They were not invited to either the NCAA tournament or NIT.

Offseason

Departures

Incoming transfers

2021 recruiting class

Roster

Schedule and results

Source:

|-
!colspan=12 style=| Exhibition

|-
!colspan=12 style=| Regular season

|-
!colspan=12 style=| ACC Tournament

|-
!colspan=12 style=| NIT

Rankings

*AP does not release post-NCAA tournament rankings^Coaches did not release a Week 2 poll.

References

Wake Forest Demon Deacons men's basketball seasons
Wake Forest
Wake Forest Demon Deacons men's basketball
Wake Forest Demon Deacons men's basketball
Wake Forest